William Beehan (1853 – 27 October 1917) was a member of the New Zealand Legislative Council from 22 June 1903 to 21 June 1910; and then 22 June 1910 – 21 June 1917 when his term ended. He was appointed by the Liberal Government.

He was from Auckland.

References 

1853 births
1917 deaths
Members of the New Zealand Legislative Council
New Zealand Liberal Party MLCs